Hillcrest, New Jersey can refer to:
Hillcrest, Paterson
Hillcrest, Trenton, New Jersey